A human search engine was a search engine that used human participation to filter the search results and assist users in clarifying their search request. The goal is to provide users with a limited number of relevant results, as opposed to traditional search engines that often return many results that may or may not be relevant.

Examples of defunct human search engines include ApexKB, ChaCha, Mahalo.com, NowNow (from Amazon.com) and Sproose.

See also 

 Human-based computation
 Human flesh search engine
 Social search

References

  
 
 
 

Internet search engines
Human-based computation